Larissa Klaassen (born 7 May 1994) is a visually impaired Dutch Paralympic cyclist. Klaassen and sighted pilot Imke Brommer won the gold medal in the women's time trial B event at the 2020 Summer Paralympics held in Tokyo, Japan. She also set a new Paralympic record of 1:05.291.

She represented the Netherlands at the 2016 Summer Paralympics in Rio de Janeiro, Brazil. Together with sighted pilot Haliegh Dolman she won the silver medal in the women's 1 km time trial B event.

Klaassen and Dolman also competed in the women's road time trial B where they finished in 11th place. They also competed in the women's road race B and they did not finish in that event.

At the 2016 UCI Para-cycling Track World Championships held in Montichiari, Italy, Dolman and Klaassen won the gold medal in the women's 1 km time trial. They also won the bronze medal in the women's sprint event.

At the 2019 UCI Para-cycling Track World Championships held in Apeldoorn, Netherlands, Klaassen and her sighted pilot Imke Brommer won the silver medal in the women's time trial 500m B event and the bronze medal in the women's sprint B event.

References

External links
 

Living people
1994 births
People from Den Helder
Cyclists at the 2016 Summer Paralympics
Cyclists at the 2020 Summer Paralympics
Paralympic gold medalists for the Netherlands
Paralympic silver medalists for the Netherlands
Paralympic medalists in cycling
Dutch female cyclists
Paralympic cyclists with a vision impairment
Paralympic cyclists of the Netherlands
Medalists at the 2016 Summer Paralympics
Medalists at the 2020 Summer Paralympics
Cyclists from North Holland
21st-century Dutch women
Dutch blind people